First, Break All the Rules, subtitled What the World's Greatest Managers Do Differently (1999), is a book authored by Marcus Buckingham and Curt Coffman, who offer solutions to better employee satisfaction with the help of examples of how the best managers handle employees. The book appeared on the New York Times bestseller list for 93 weeks.Time magazine listed the book as one of "The 25 Most Influential Business Management Books".

Content outline
Buckingham and Coffman discuss the fallacies of standard management thinking and how good managers create and sustain employee satisfaction. The book is a result of observations based on 80,000 interviews with managers as conducted by the Gallup Organization in the last 25 years. The core of the matter lies in how these managers have debunked old myths about management and how they created new truths on obtaining and keeping talented people in their organization. Some key ideas of the book include what the best managers do and don't do: they treat every employee as an individual; they don't try to fix weaknesses, but instead focus on strengths and talent; and they find ways to measure, count, and reward outcomes.

See also
 Motivation

References

External links
 More info about the book at Gallup Management site

Business books
American non-fiction books
1999 non-fiction books
Simon & Schuster books
Collaborative non-fiction books